Mike Wainwright (born 25 February 1975) is a former Scotland international rugby league footballer who played in the . He played for the Salford City Reds and the Warrington Wolves in the Super League, the Leigh Centurions (Heritage No. 1300) in the RFL Championship and for the Swinton Lions in National League Two.

Background
Wainwright was born in Warrington, Cheshire, England.

Career
He has previously played in the Super League for the Warrington Wolves, the Salford City Reds and the Leigh Centurions.

Played for Woolston Rovers before joining Warrington's Academy, he was a halfback as a junior and played  in the 1993 Academy Cup Final victory, before switching to back row. He left the Warrington Wolves at the end of the 1999's Super League IV to join the Salford City Reds, his game developed at the Willows and he returned a more experienced and confident player in 2003's Super League VIII, playing the best rugby of his career as the club moved to the Halliwell Jones Stadium.

Following his career in rugby, Mike moved into financial services and is currently working as 'Head of Partnerships' for AFEX based in Manchester.

International
He toured Australia with Great Britain Academy in 1994, and missed most of 1995's Super League I with a recurring foot injury.

Wainwright is a former Scotland international.

References

External links
Leigh profile
Convert To Reference Statistics at rugbyleagueproject.org
(archived by web.archive.org) Statistics at slstats.org
SCOTLAND RUGBY LEAGUE INTERNATIONAL HONOURS BOARD
Wainwright makes Salford return

1975 births
Living people
English people of Scottish descent
English rugby league players
Leigh Leopards players
Rugby league players from Warrington
Rugby league second-rows
Salford Red Devils players
Scotland national rugby league team players
Swinton Lions players
Warrington Wolves players